The 1996 Tasmanian state election was held on 24 February 1996.

House of Assembly
Sitting members are shown in bold text. Tickets that elected at least one MHA are highlighted in the relevant colour. Successful candidates are indicated by an asterisk (*).

Bass
Seven seats were up for election. The Labor Party was defending two seats. The Liberal Party was defending four seats. The Tasmanian Greens were defending one seat.

Braddon
Seven seats were up for election. The Labor Party was defending one seat. The Liberal Party was defending five seats. The Tasmanian Greens were defending one seat.

Denison
Seven seats were up for election. The Labor Party was defending three seats. The Liberal Party was defending three seats. The Tasmanian Greens were defending one seat.

Franklin
Seven seats were up for election. The Labor Party was defending three seats. The Liberal Party was defending three seats. The Tasmanian Greens were defending one seat.

Lyons
Seven seats were up for election. The Labor Party was defending two seats. The Liberal Party was defending four seats. The Tasmanian Greens were defending one seat.

See also
 Members of the Tasmanian House of Assembly, 1992–1996
 Members of the Tasmanian House of Assembly, 1996–1998

References
Tasmanian Parliamentary Library

Candidates for Tasmanian state elections